Elizabeth Owens may refer to:

 Elizabeth Owens (actress), stage actress
 Elizabeth Owens (schooner), a schooner, built in 1857
 Elizabeth Owens (cricketer), Irish women cricketer